Ihering might be

Hermann von Ihering (1850–1930), German-Brazilian naturalist
Herbert Ihering (1888–1977), German theater critic
Rodolpho von Ihering (1883–1939) Brazilian zoologist, son of Hermann von Ihering
Rudolf von Jhering (1818–1892), German jurist